The  (Treasury of the French language in Quebec, TLFQ) is a project created in the 1970s with the primary objective of establishing a scientific infrastructure for research into the history of Quebec French and, also, its current usage.

Since the late 1990s, the TLFQ has led the international project  (Panfrancophone lexicographic database) (BDLP), whose goal is to develop and bring together databases representative of the French used in Francophonie member countries.

Members 

 Claude Poirier, director of research
 Myriam Côté, documentalist, responsible for training for the BDLP 
 Geneviève Joncas, researcher, lexicographer
 Jean-François Smith, linguist, computer scientist and web master 
 Jacques Leclerc, linguist, associate member, responsible for the site L'aménagement linguistique dans le monde (language demographics and language policies worldwide)

Current projects 

 Digitalization of the lexical database created by the TLFQ over some 20 years
 The second edition of the Dictionnaire historique du français québécois
 Annotated Timeline of Quebec French online
 BDLP-Québec, the Québec section of the BDLP

Notes

External links 
 Web site of the TLFQ
 Lexical Database of Quebec French
 Web site of the BDLP
 Dictionnaire historique du français québécois. (1998) Trésor de la langue française au Québec, directed by Claude Poirier at the University of Ottawa

Quebec French